Fresonara (Piedmontese: Fërsnèira) is a comune (municipality) in the province of Alessandria in the Italian region Piedmont, located about  southeast of Turin and about  southeast of Alessandria.

Fresonara borders the following municipalities: Basaluzzo, Bosco Marengo, and Predosa.

In 1404 it was destroyed by Facino Cane. It was annexed to the possessione of the House of Savoy in the 18th century.

References

Cities and towns in Piedmont